Picardia is a genus of moths in the family Pterophoridae.

Species
Picardia betsileo Gibeaux, 1994
Picardia eparches (Meyrick, 1931)
Picardia orchatias (Meyrick, 1908)
Picardia ruwenzoricus (Gielis, 1991)

Oidaematophorini
Moth genera